Jenišovice is name of several locations in the Czech Republic:

 Jenišovice (Chrudim District), a village in the Pardubice Region
 Jenišovice (Jablonec nad Nisou District), a village in the Liberec Region
 Jenišovice (Mělník District), a village near Býkev